Mimosa is a genus of about 590 species of herbs and shrubs, in the mimosoid clade of the legume family Fabaceae. The generic name is derived from the Greek word  (mimos), an "actor" or "mime", and the feminine suffix -osa, "resembling", suggesting its 'sensitive leaves' which seem to 'mimic conscious life'.

Two species in the genus are especially notable. One is Mimosa pudica, commonly known as touch-me-not, which folds its leaves when touched or exposed to heat. It is native to southern Central and South America but is widely cultivated elsewhere for its curiosity value, both as a houseplant in temperate areas, and outdoors in the tropics. Outdoor cultivation has led to weedy invasion in some areas, notably Hawaii. The other is Mimosa tenuiflora, which is best known for its use in shamanic ayahuasca brews due to the psychedelic drug dimethyltryptamine found in its root bark.

Taxonomy
The taxonomy of the genus Mimosa has gone through several periods of splitting and lumping, ultimately accumulating over 3,000 names, many of which have either been synonymized under other species or transferred to other genera. In part due to these changing circumscriptions, the name "Mimosa" has also been applied to several other related species with similar pinnate or bipinnate leaves, but are now classified in other genera. The most common examples of this are Albizia julibrissin (Persian silk tree) and Acacia dealbata (wattle).

Description

Members of this genus are among the few plants capable of rapid movement; examples outside of Mimosa include the telegraph plant, Aldrovanda, some species of Drosera and the Venus flytrap. The leaves of the Mimosa pudica close quickly when touched. Some mimosas raise their leaves in the day and lower them at night, and experiments done by Jean-Jacques d'Ortous de Mairan on mimosas in 1729 provided the first evidence of biological clocks.

Mimosa can be distinguished from the large related genera, Acacia and Albizia, since its flowers have ten or fewer stamens. Botanically, what appears to be a single globular flower is actually a cluster of many individual ones. Mimosas contain some level of heptanoic acid.

Species

 

There are about 590 species including:
Mimosa aculeaticarpa Ortega

Mimosa andina Benth.

Mimosa arenosa (Willd.) Poir.

Mimosa asperata L.
Mimosa borealis Gray
Mimosa caesalpiniaefolia Benth.

Mimosa casta L.

Mimosa cupica Gray
Mimosa ceratonia L.
Mimosa diplotricha C.Wright ex Sauvalle
Mimosa disperma Barneby
Mimosa distachya Cav.
Mimosa dysocarpa Benth.
Mimosa emoryana Benth.

Mimosa grahamii Gray

Mimosa hamata Willd.

Mimosa hystricina (Small ex Britt. et Rose) B.L.Turner

Mimosa invisa Martius ex Colla
Mimosa latidens (Small) B.L. Turner
Mimosa laxiflora Benth.

Mimosa loxensis Barneby
Mimosa malacophylla Gray

Mimosa microphylla Dry.

Mimosa nothacacia Barneby

Mimosa nuttallii (DC.) B.L. Turner

Mimosa ophthalmocentra Mart. ex Benth. 1865
Mimosa pellita Kunth ex Willd.

Mimosa pigra L.

Mimosa polycarpa Kunth
Mimosa pudica L.
Mimosa quadrivalvis L.
Mimosa quadrivalvis var. hystricina (Small) Barneby
Mimosa quadrivalvis var. quadrivalvis L.

Mimosa roemeriana Scheele

Mimosa rubicaulis Lam.

Mimosa rupertiana B.L. Turner

Mimosa scabrella Benth.
Mimosa schomburgkii Benth.

Mimosa somnians Humb. & Bonpl. ex Willd.
Mimosa strigillosa Torr. et Gray

Mimosa tenuiflora (Willd.) Poir. (= Mimosa hostilis)

Mimosa texana (Gray) Small

Mimosa townsendii Barneby
Mimosa turneri Barneby
Mimosa verrucosa Benth.

References

External links

Mimosa-pudica.de
Two small videos showing the plant folding its leaves

 
Fabaceae genera
Articles containing video clips